Shavit 2 (Hebrew: "comet" - 2 שביט) was the first Israeli sounding rocket, launched on 5 July 1961 for meteorological research. 

The weight of Shavit 2 was 250 kg and its height was 3.76 metres. The rocket achieved a height of 80 km.

The Shavit sounding rocket is distinct from the later Shavit 2 space launch vehicle also produced by Israel to launch Ofeq reconnaissance satellites into low Earth orbit beginning in September 1988.

See also 
 RAFAEL Armament Development Authority... by Munia Merdor, Ministry of Defense publishing, 1980, pp. 319–348.
 Above the Horizon, 50 years of Israel's Space Activity, by Dani Shalom, BaAvir flight publishing, 2003, pp. 12–15.

References 

Sounding rockets of Israel